The southeastern four-eyed opossum (Philander frenatus) is an opossum species native to South America.  It is found in Atlantic Forest ecoregions, in Brazil, Paraguay and Argentina.

Description
It is a large dark gray opossum.  Dorsal fur is dark gray, and the fur on the sides is also gray, but lighter than the dorsal fur. The ventral fur is white or cream-colored. The hairs on the throat have gray bases, but are divided in two by a cream-colored vertical stripe going along the midline of the throat. Its fur is short. Its tail is dark brown or black for its entire length.

References

John F. Eisenberg and Kent H. Redford, 2000. Mammals of the Neotropics: Ecuador, Bolivia and Brazil.

Opossums
Opossum, Southeastern Four-eyed
Opossum, Southeastern Four-eyed
Mammals of Argentina
Mammals of Brazil
Mammals of Paraguay
Mammals described in 1818
Taxa named by Ignaz von Olfers